This is the '''list of cathedrals in Israel, sorted by denomination.

Church of the Holy Sepulchre
 Church of the Holy Sepulchre in Jerusalem's Old City (home of six denominations: Roman Catholic, Greek Orthodox, Armenian Orthodox, Syriac Orthodox, Coptic Orthodox and Ethiopian Orthodox.)

Eastern Orthodox
Eastern Orthodox cathedrals in Israel:
 Cathedral Holy Church of Saint James the Brother of the God in Jerusalem (Armenian Apostolic Church)
 Holy Trinity Cathedral in Jerusalem (Russian Orthodox)

Oriental Orthodox
Oriental Orthodox cathedrals in Israel:
 Cathedral of St. James in Jerusalem's Old City (Armenian Apostolic)

Catholic Church

Cathedrals of the Roman Catholic Church in Israel:
St. Elijah Cathedral in Haifa (Melkite Greek Rite)
Cathedral of St. Louis the King in Haifa (Maronite Rite)
Co-Cathedral of the Most Holy Name of Jesus in Jerusalem's Old City (Latin Rite)
Cathedral of the Annunciation of the Virgin in Jerusalem (Melkite Greek Rite)
Church of St. Thomas in Jerusalem (Syriac Catholic Rite)
Church of Our Lady of the Spasm in Jerusalem (Armenian Catholic Rite)

Anglican
Anglican Cathedrals in Israel:
 St. George's Cathedral in Jerusalem (of the Episcopal Church in Jerusalem and the Middle East)

See also
 Lists of cathedrals
 Christianity in Israel

References

Cathedrals in Israel
Israel
Cathedrals
Cathedrals